The following are cities in Western Sahara, listed by population. Due to an ongoing conflict over the territory, the majority is controlled by Morocco, and the eastern and southern portions are controlled by the Sahrawi Arab Democratic Republic (SADR). Only those cities under Moroccan administration are subject to the government census; SADR-controlled cities are listed at the end. Morocco claims the entire territory, as does the SADR. The list includes cities, towns, villages, oases and other settlements.

List

See also
List of cities in Morocco
Moroccan Wall
Tindouf and refugee camps

Notes

External links

Census information

 
Western Sahara
Western Sahara
Cities